Exulonyx is a genus of braconid wasps in the family Braconidae. There is at least one described species in Exulonyx, E. camma, found in South Africa.

References

Microgastrinae